In computer science, specifically in the field of formal verification, well-structured transition systems (WSTSs) are a general class of infinite state systems for which many verification problems are decidable, owing to the existence of a kind of order between the states of the system which is compatible with the transitions of the system. WSTS decidability results can be applied to Petri nets, lossy channel systems, and more.

Formal definition 
The set  is said to be well-quasi-ordered, or shortly wqo.

In general a transition system may have additional structure like initial states, labels on transitions, accepting states, etc. (indicated by the dots), but they do not concern us here.

A well-structured transition system consists of a transition system , such that
  is a well-quasi-ordering on the set of states.

Well-structured systems 

Well-structured systems adapt the theory of well-structured transition systems for modelling certain classes of systems encountered in computer science and provide the basis for decision procedures to analyse such systems, hence the supplementary requirements: the definition of a WSTS itself says nothing about the computability of the relations , .

Uses in Computer Science

Well-structured Systems 

Coverability can be decided for any well-structured system, and so can reachability of a given control state, by the backward algorithm of Abdulla et al. or for specific subclasses of well-structured systems (subject to strict monotonicity, e.g. in the case of unbounded Petri nets) by a forward analysis based on a Karp-Miller coverability graph.

Backward Algorithm 

The backward algorithm allows the following question to be answered: given a well-structured system and a state , is there any transition path that leads from a given start state  to a state  (such a state is said to cover )?

An intuitive explanation for this question is: if  represents an error state, then any state containing it should also be regarded as an error state. If a well-quasi-order can be found that models this "containment" of states and which also fulfills the requirement of monotonicity with respect to the transition relation, then this question can be answered.

Instead of one minimal error state , one typically considers an upward closed set  of error states.

The algorithm is based on the facts that in a well-quasi-order , any upward closed set has a finite set of minima, and any sequence  of upward-closed subsets of  converges after finitely many steps (1).

The algorithm needs to store an upward-closed set  of states in memory, which it can do because an upward-closed set is representable as a finite set of minima. It starts from the upward closure of the set of error states  and computes at each iteration the (by monotonicity also upward-closed) set of immediate predecessors and adding it to the set . This iteration terminates after a finite number of steps, due to the property (1) of well-quasi-orders. If  is in the set finally obtained, then the output is "yes" (a state of  can be reached), otherwise it is "no" (it is not possible to reach such a state).

References 

Wellfoundedness
Automata (computation)